Albert Kenneth Kozar  (July 5, 1921 – September 6, 2007) was an American second baseman in Major League Baseball. He played for the Washington Senators and Chicago White Sox over a three-year career in the Major Leagues.

Born in McKees Rocks, Pennsylvania, Kozar was signed by the Boston Red Sox as an amateur free agent in 1941. Kozar played for the Red Sox's minor league affiliates, interrupted by a three-year break when Kozar served in the United States Army.

On December 10, 1947, Kozar was traded to the Washington Senators along with Leon Culberson in exchange for Stan Spence. Kozar made his Major League debut with the Senators on April 19, 1948, at Griffith Stadium, going 1–for–4 against the New York Yankees. Kozar played for the Senators until 1950, when he was traded on May 31 to the Chicago White Sox along with Eddie Robinson and Ray Scarborough, in exchange for Bob Kuzava, Cass Michaels and Johnny Ostrowski. Kozar continued to play in the minor leagues until 1954, and died on September 6, 2007, in Palm Beach Gardens, Florida.

References

External links
, or Retrosheet

1921 births
2007 deaths
United States Army personnel of World War II
Augusta Rams players
Baseball players from Pennsylvania
Charleston Senators players
Chicago White Sox players
Danville-Scholfield Leafs players
Major League Baseball second basemen
Memphis Chickasaws players
New Orleans Pelicans (baseball) players
Oakland Oaks (baseball) players
People from McKees Rocks, Pennsylvania
Scranton Red Sox players
Tulsa Oilers (baseball) players
Washington Senators (1901–1960) players